Kolady Govindan Kutty Menon (1928 - 13 August 2003) was an Indian politician and leader of Communist Party of India (CPI). He represented Andathode constituency in 1st Kerala Legislative Assembly elected in the 1957 Kerala Legislative Assembly election.

References

Communist Party of India politicians from Kerala
1928 births
2003 deaths